Frank Anderson may refer to:

Politics and law
 Frank Anderson (judge) (1870–1931), American jurist, Justice of the South Dakota Supreme Court
 Frank Anderson (politician) (1889–1959), British Labour Party Member of Parliament for Whitehaven, 1935–1959
 Frank Anderson (Manitoba politician), Canadian politician (see 1962 Manitoba general election)

Sports
 Frank B. Anderson (1882–1966), American college baseball and football coach
 Frank G. Anderson (1891–1985), American college football coach
 Frank Anderson (footballer, born 1913) (1913–1997), Australian rules footballer for Carlton
 Frank Anderson (footballer, born 1916) (1916–1971), Australian rules footballer for North Melbourne
 Frank Anderson (chess player) (1928–1980), Canadian chess master
 Frank Anderson (Canadian football) (1928–1983), American football player in the Canadian Football League
 Frank Anderson (baseball coach) (born 1959), American college baseball coach

Others
 Frank Maloy Anderson (1871–1961), American historian, professor, and writer
 Frank P. Anderson (fl. 1906), American civic leader, member of the Committee of Fifty
 Frank J. Anderson (born c. 1938), American police officer, sheriff of Marion County, Indiana
 Frank L. Anderson (born 1957), American animator, director, author, and musician

See also
 Frank Andersson (1956–2018), Swedish wrestler
 Francis Anderson (disambiguation)